Chicco is an Italian manufacturer of children's clothing and toys with retail outlets worldwide, producing products in Italy and  China. It is owned by Artsana, and has been in business for 60 years and is now in more than 120 countries.

History 
Chicco was founded in 1958 by Cavaliere del Lavoro Pietro Catelli who wanted to celebrate the birth of his first son Enrico, affectionately known as “Chicco”. On his death in 2006, the company passed to his three children, Enrico, Michele and Francesca, who would open new branches in India, Russia, Mexico and Poland. Since May 2013, the role of Managing Director has been held by Claudio De Conto.

Products and research 

Chicco is present in over 120 countries, with more than 150 shops in Italy and another 160 throughout the world. 
Chicco has a range of products, including maternity items for pregnancy and breastfeeding, first baby foods, hygiene and protection, out-and-about and travelling, relaxation and sleep, play, clothes, and booties and shoes.

The company's research and development area is the responsibility of the Baby Research Center dedicated to children aged 0 to 3 and all their psycho-physical, emotional and social needs. The centre makes use of information from the medical-scientific world, and continuous interaction with parents.

Chicco has come up with Baby Moments Range of products with 0% Polyphenoxyethanol

Social commitment 
Chicco's partnership with Ai. Bi. Associazione Amici dei Bambini dates back a number of years, to 2003.

In 2010, the Chicco di Felicità was born. Profits from sales of this charity go towards supporting the "Chicco di Felicità per bimbi speciali" project, promoting the adoption of children with special needs.

Since then, the Chicco di Felicità has won a legion of more than 300,000 fans who have chosen the charm for themselves or as a gift;  it has been interpreted and customised in various ways by numerous brands and designers, each adding a new and original touch. It is
available in all Chicco stores in Italy.

Chicco has been supporting the Mission Bambini Foundation at international level since 2013, with financial contributions to fund medical care and interventions for children suffering from heart conditions and to provide training for local doctors, through the project "Happiness goes
from heart-to-heart".  The Group management team takes part in a range of humanitarian missions.

References

External links

Official company site
Official corporate site

Clothing companies of Italy
Retail companies established in 1958
Manufacturing companies established in 1958
Toy brands
Toy companies of Italy
Italian companies established in 1958
Toy companies established in 1958